Cerithium alutaceum is a species of sea snail, a marine gastropod mollusk in the family Cerithiidae.

Description

Distribution
This marine species occurs in the China Seas.

References

 Jousseaume F. (1931 ["1930"]) Cerithiidae de la Mer Rouge. Journal de Conchyliologie 74(4): 270–296.
 Yokoyama M. (1924). Molluscan remains from the lowest part of the Jo-ban coal-field. Journal of the College of Science, Imperial University of Tokyo. 45(3): 1–22, pls 1–5
 Yokoyama M. (1925). Molluscan remains from the uppermost part of the Joban coalfield. Journal of the College of Science, Imperial University, Tōkyō. 45(5): 1-34, pls 1–6.

External links
 Gould, A. A. (1861). Description of new shells collected by the United States North Pacific Exploring Expedition. Proceedings of the Boston Society of Natural History. 7: 385-389 [January 1861], 401-409 [February 1861]; 8: 14-32 [March 1861], 33-40 
 Tryon G.W., jr. (1887). Manual of conchology, structural and systematic, with illustrations of the species. (1)9: Solariidae, Ianthinidae, Trichotropidae, Scalariidae, Cerithiidae, Rissoidae, Littorinidae, pp. 1-488, pl. 1-71
 Hasegawa K. (2017). Family Cerithiidae. pp. 788–793, in: T. Okutani (ed.), Marine Mollusks in Japan, ed. 2. 2 vols. Tokai University Press. 1375 pp.

Cerithiidae
Gastropods described in 1881